Erythranthe inconspicua, synonym Mimulus inconspicuus, is an uncommon species of monkeyflower known by the common name smallflower monkeyflower.

Distribution
It is endemic to California, where it is known only from the Sierra Nevada foothills. It grows mainly in moist areas with partial shade.

Description
Erythranthe inconspicua is an annual herb producing a thin but elongated and sometimes branching stem up to 30 centimeters long. The leaves are oval in shape, the largest ones up to 4 centimeters long and arranged in a basal rosette, and smaller ones located in pairs along the stem. The tubular throat of the flower is encapsulated in a calyx of sepals which swells as the fruits mature. The pink flower is up to about 1.5 centimeters long and wide, its face divided into five notched lobes.

References

External links
Jepson Manual Treatment - Mimulus inconspicuus
USDA Plants Profile
Mimulus inconspicuus - Photo gallery

inconspicua
Endemic flora of California
Flora of the Sierra Nevada (United States)
Natural history of the California chaparral and woodlands
Flora without expected TNC conservation status